The Ministry of Primary and Secondary Education is a department in the Government of Zimbabwe that is responsible for the management of primary and secondary education within the country. The incumbent minister is Hon. Dr. Evelyn Ndlovu who was appointed in September 2021.

References

Government of Zimbabwe
Zimbabwe